Harold Arthur Giancanelli (born May 21, 1929) is a former professional American football player who played Halfback for four seasons in the National Football League (NFL) with the Philadelphia Eagles.

Prior to his NFL career, Giancanelli served in the Korean War.  After his NFL career, and a brief stop in the Canadian Football League (CFL) where he won the 1958 Grey Cup with the Hamilton Tiger Cats, Giancanelli returned to his alma mater and served as the head football coach at Lincoln High School.  From there he became the head football coach at El Camino Real High School just prior to that school's opening in 1969.

References

1929 births
American football halfbacks
Living people
Loyola Lions football players
Philadelphia Eagles players
Players of American football from Los Angeles